Alpha Media LLC is a radio broadcasting company based in Portland, Oregon, and led by Bob Proffitt.  The group does business under the Alpha Media name.

It was formed from the merger of Alpha Broadcasting, L&L Broadcasting, and Main Line Broadcasting on July 1, 2014.

It owns its radio stations through Alpha Media Licensee, LLC.  At its formation, it owned 68 radio stations in 12 markets, along with two theatres (in Portland and San Antonio) and a digital marketing firm in Peoria, Illinois.

Alpha Broadcasting
Alpha Broadcasting was founded in 2009 in Portland, Oregon by Larry Wilson, arising from the sale of stations formerly a part of the CBS Radio Portland cluster with those of Rose City Radio.

On April 17, 2014, L&L Broadcasting announced that it has agreed to merge with Alpha, while purchasing the stations of Main Line Broadcasting.  The combined entity became known as Alpha Media.

L&L Broadcasting
The broadcasting group was sometimes referred to as Live and Local.

L&L was formed in 2012 to buy all but two of the radio stations of Triad Broadcasting for $21 million; the deal, involving 32 stations in 5 radio markets, closed in May 2013, and transfer was finalized in June 2013.  L&L immediately arranged for the 6 stations in the Fargo, North Dakota market to be sold to Jim Ingstad.

In August 2013, L&L arranged to buy, from YMF Media (Yucaipa Companies and Earvin "Magic" Johnson), the six stations formerly owned by Inner City Broadcasting in the Jackson, Mississippi radio market.

In September, 2013, L&L definitively agreed to purchase an additional 5 stations in Columbia, South Carolina from YMF Media.

On April 17, 2014, L&L Broadcasting announced that it has agreed to merge with Alpha Broadcasting, while purchasing the stations of Main Line Broadcasting.

Post-merger changes

On October 10, 2014, Alpha Media announced that it will be purchasing the remaining stations owned by Buckley Broadcasting in Bakersfield and Merced, California.  These were the last stations remaining to be divested by Buckley, which had begun to sell off its radio assets in 2008. The purchase of the Buckley stations was consummated on December 31, 2014, at a price of $5.8 million.

On January 1, 2015, Alpha Media began an LMA on the Access.1 stations in Shreveport, Louisiana and Tyler/Longview, Texas. The purchase was consummated on April 14, 2015, at a price of $13.75 million. Effective February 1, 2017 Alpha transferred control of KFRO to a new owner, and returned operation of KCUL-FM, and KSYR to Access.1.

Effective May 1, 2015, Alpha Media acquired four stations and a translator in the Fredericksburg, Virginia market from The Free Lance-Star, at a price of $8.1 million.

On August 17, 2015, Alpha Media announced it was purchasing Palm Springs, California radio stations KDES-FM and KPSI-FM ("Mix 100.5"). While the purchase price was not originally announced, the transaction was consummated on December 29, 2015 at a price of $3 million.

On February 25, 2016, Alpha Media acquired Digity, LLC for $264 million, adding 116 stations in 26 markets to its portfolio for a total of 251.

In September 2017, Alpha Media announced that it would sell its clusters in Savannah, Kinston/New Bern/Jacksonville, and Myrtle Beach, to Dick Broadcasting Corporation for $19.5 million. Dick assumed control of the stations under local marketing agreements shortly afterward. However, the sale of the Savannah, Georgia stations will not be filed with the FCC until August 2019, with Dick operating them under an LMA for the time being.

Theatres
Alpha Media owns the Skype Live Studio (formerly known as The Bing Lounge) in Portland and The Alamo Lounge in San Antonio, Texas.

Station list

Holdings

Divestments

References

External links

Mass media companies established in 2014
2014 establishments in Oregon
Companies based in Portland, Oregon
Radio broadcasting companies of the United States
Alpha Media radio stations
Companies that filed for Chapter 11 bankruptcy in 2021